Yuvalı is a village in the İdil District of Şırnak Province in Turkey. The village is populated by Kurds of the Harunan tribe and had a population of 291 in 2021.

The hamlets of Camili and Yamaç are attached to the village.

References 

Villages in İdil District
Kurdish settlements in Şırnak Province